Vortex is a science fiction novel by American-Canadian writer Robert Charles Wilson, published in July 2011. It is the third book in the Spin series, following the Hugo Award-winning Spin and Axis.

Plot Summary
Vortex tells the story of Turk Findley, the protagonist introduced in Axis, who is transported ten thousand years into the future by the mysterious entities called "the Hypotheticals." In this future humanity exists on a chain of planets connected by Hypothetical gateways; but Earth itself is a dying world, effectively quarantined.

Turk and his young friend Isaac Dvali are taken up by a community of fanatics who use them to enable a passage to the dying Earth, where they believe a prophecy of human/Hypothetical contact will be fulfilled. The prophecy is only partly true, however, and Turk must unravel the truth about the nature and purpose of the Hypotheticals before they carry him on a journey through warped time to the end of the universe itself.

Timeline
The chapters of the book alternate between two timelines: one approximately 40 years following the events of Spin and the other approximately 10,000 years following the events of Axis.

Reception

Reviewer David Mead writes that readers will be very pleased with the final adventure:

References

External links
 
 Vortex at Worlds Without End
 Publisher's website for Vortex.

2011 American novels
Novels by Robert Charles Wilson
Tor Books books